Neomyostoma is a genus of parasitic flies in the family Tachinidae. There is one described species in Neomyostoma, N. ptilodexioides.

Distribution
Brazil.

References

Dexiinae
Diptera of South America
Monotypic Brachycera genera
Tachinidae genera
Taxa named by Charles Henry Tyler Townsend